Adam Gottlob von Krogh (May 16, 1768 – January 17, 1839) was a Norwegian-Danish military officer, and the son of Major General Caspar Herman von Krogh (b. December 1, 1725 - d. 1802) and his wife Christiane Ulrica née Lerche (November 1, 1730 – August 21, 1803, in Eidsvoll).

He was married to his cousin Magdalene (née von Krogh) (June 13, 1775 – December 19, 1847) Daughter of the following titular Privy Councilor Frederick Ferdinand von Krogh (d. 1829).

Military career 
At age 12, he was sent to study at the Søakademiet in Copenhagen, receiving an appointment as Ensign to the Crown Prince's Regiment in 1786. From 1788, he was Sekondlieutenant in the Royal Guard on foot.

In 1790, he went to Lindholm to serve as page chamber of the Crown Prince at Christiansborg Palace. He was the Inspection Officer at the time of the great Christiansborg Palace fire of 1794, and was badly injured while attempting to stop the fire. In 1816, he was made Colonel. He was then director of the Sound Customs House and Chamberlain to King Frederick VI of Denmark who  knighted von Krogh, Commander Order of the Dannebrog in 1828 and then bestowed him with the Grand Cross Order of the Dannebrog in 1836.  He lived at Marienlyst Castle between 1796 and his death in 1839 after which Frederick VI of Denmark graciously let his widow Magdalene remain living there till her death in 1847.

Order of the Dannebrog, Grand Cross

References

Sources

Books

Online 

1768 births
1839 deaths
Norwegian military personnel
Danish military personnel
Danish nobility
Von Krogh family
Grand Crosses of the Order of the Dannebrog
Danish Customs Service personnel